Nick Chappell (born September 19, 1992) is a Canadian-born American tennis player.

Chappell has a career high ATP singles ranking of 329 achieved on November 8, 2021. He also has a career high ATP doubles ranking of 416 achieved on June 27, 2016.

Chappell made his ATP main draw debut at the 2022 Los Cabos Open after qualifying for the main draw in singles, defeating Maxime Janvier and Aziz Dougaz to qualify. He also qualified for the 2023 Mexican Open defeating second qualifying seed Steve Johnson and New Zealander Rubin Statham.

References

External links

1992 births
Living people
Canadian emigrants to the United States
American male tennis players
TCU Horned Frogs men's tennis players
Tennis players from Toronto